Marshlands Conservancy is a 147-acre nature preserve in the city of Rye, New York, that is fully owned and operated by Westchester County Parks. It has numerous wildlife habitats from ponds to creeks to a large meadow area, succession forest, freshwater wetlands and the only extensive salt marsh in Westchester. It borders Long Island Sound and can be entered via an easement on the historic Boston Post Road. It is one of 5 properties that together constitute the Boston Post Road Historic District. It has high archaeological sensitivity. The conservancy has also been designated an Important Bird Area.

Early history
Archaeology supports the presence of a vibrant Indigenous peoples population for thousands of years at the location. Findings include identification of pre-contact deposits from the Archaic and Woodland periods. Elements of the land like the field were regularly cleared in the 1600s by colonial residents. Previous to that, it is believed that Indigenous stewards cleared brush to prevent reforestation and facilitate hunting and agriculture.

Immediately prior to its 20th century partitioning, the Conservancy land was part of two neighboring estates: the Jay Estate, owned by Founding Father John Jay and his descendants between 1745 and 1905; this parcel was 400 acres in size. Another portion of the conservancy was originally part of neighboring Lounsbury owned by the Parsons family as far back as the early 1800s.

Modern history (1966–present)
The nature preserve, first named the Devereux Reservation or Conservancy, came into being through two separate real estate donations in 1966 and again in 1977.

The initial gift was one of 120 acres from Zilph Palmer Devereux to Westchester County made on November 9, 1966 and formally accepted by the Westchester County Board of Supervisors on November 21, 1966. The land was planned to be kept as a completely natural park.

A small shelter was built in 1972 and the property re-opened as Marshlands Park on June 7, 1972 during the dedication of the preserve. A special volunteer Advisory Board was created to ensure continued oversight of the County's management of the land.

Another donation of 17 acres was contributed by Fanny Wickes Parsons in 1977 with the caveat "that no garages or maintenance buildings be erected and that no marinas be built on or near the shorefront of the
tract."

The ensuing property of 147 acres [59 ha] (which includes tidal lands) was rededicated in 1997 as passive parkland by the Board of Legislators of Westchester County "The natural area and wildlife sanctuary will be protected, preserved and regulated as a nature and wildlife preserve to be used only for passive recreation." That same year, a Friends group was organized to help staff the shelter and provide tours as well as raise additional funds to supplement the maintenance and mowing of the meadow.

Features

Archaeological sensitivities
A 1985 report confirmed the importance of Rye Marshlands as one of two sites in Rye with high archaeological significance, the other being an area in the Blind Brook watershed. The discovery of 88 stone fishtail points and fragments, 31 of which were collected between 1981 and 1987 by Stuart Fiedel, further suggests encampments of what is known as an Orient phase or culture at the site. Additional artifacts were found by Wilbur Clark.

Salt marsh and tidal flats
The preserve's salt marsh was recognized in 1987 as a rare ecosystem and tidal flats community by the N.Y.S. Department of State Division of Coastal Resources & Waterfront Revitalization.

Woodland trails and ruins
There are two trail loops. One is 2.8 miles long. Passive recreation only is permitted at Marshlands Conservancy including walking, hiking and birdwatching. Dogs and bikes are strictly forbidden according to regulations adopted on December 31, 1975.
Ruins of a summer home built on the property by 20th century owners can be found on the trail alongside the water. All that remains is a chimney and stone foundation.

Watercourses
The East Stream and West Creek are two watercourses that run through the Marshlands Conservancy.

Fauna
Marshlands Conservancy is home to many creatures from horseshoe crabs to coyotes. Visitors can see foxes, herons, egrets and more. Nature study is especially focused on salt water life.

Birds
The Conservancy land was donated with the goal of creating a wildlife sanctuary especially for waterfowl and migratory birds. Over 230 species of birds have been spotted from Black rail to American Avocet.

Fish and shellfish
Marine life at Marshlands include pipefish, small crabs (often hidden in rocky structures off of the water), and killifish.

Mammals
Deer, fox, coyotes, rabbits and groundhogs are among the mammals that have habitats at the conservancy.

Flora
A trail guide published in the 1980s under the auspices of then Westchester County Executive Alfred DelBello and Parks Commissioner Joseph M. Claverly noted the location of both native and invasive species along pathways, in the woods, next to bridges and by the beach and marsh.

Native plants and trees

The biodiversity of the Marshlands Conservancy has changed since its creation as a preserve. Native plants found at the Conservancy once included:

Black birch
Bladderwrack
Butterfly weed
Christmas fern
Dogtooth violet
False Solomon's seal
Giant sunflower
Glasswort
Groundsel tree
Heath aster
Jewelweed
Lopseed 
Marsh elder
Marsh mallow 
New York aster
Poison ivy
Post oak
Sassafras
Seaside goldenrod
Skunk cabbage
Spartina
Spicebush
Sweet gum
Trillium
Tulip tree
White ash
White oak
Wild geranium
Wild strawberry

Invasive species
Like many other sanctuaries that are impacted by climate change, the ecology of Marshlands is changing due to the aggressive pressure of invasive species. Disturbed waste areas at the conservancy include a refuse dump next to the long meadow where Tree of Heaven can be found. According to the Audubon, invasive plants like Tatarian honeysuckle and Norway maples cause harm to native plants and the local ecosystem. Other invasive species identified include:

Common burdock
Crabapple
Creeping bellflower
Curly dock
Deptford pink
Everlasting pea
Garlic mustard
Japanese barberry
Japanese knotweed
Japanese stiltgrass
Jetbead
Mugwort
Multiflora rose
Norway maples
Oriental bittersweet
Phragmites
Porcelainberry
Privet
Tatarian honeysuckle
Tree of heaven
Wineberry
Wrinkled rose
  

Asian shore crabs have been implicated in the decline of the common periwinkle at Marshlands.

References

National Historic Landmarks in New York (state)
U.S. Route 1
African-American history of New York (state)
John Jay
Historic district contributing properties in New York (state)
National Register of Historic Places in Westchester County, New York
Parks in Westchester County, New York
Rye, New York
Important Bird Areas of New York (state)
Nature reserves in New York (state)